John Kidman Stuart Ridley Barker (1912–1992) was Dean of Cloyne from 1973 until 1984.

He was educated at Durham University and Lichfield Theological College; and ordained in 1936. After curacies at Stockton-on-Tees, Barnard Castle and Castleside he held incumbencies at Cornforth, Warter and Over Whitacre until his appointment as Dean.

References

1912 births
Alumni of Durham University
Alumni of Lichfield Theological College
20th-century Irish Anglican priests
Deans of Cloyne
1992 deaths